Wildorado is an unincorporated community in Oldham County, Texas, United States. According to the Handbook of Texas, the community had an estimated population of 180 in 2000.

Geography
Wildorado is located along FM 809 south of and Main Street north of Interstate 40, east of Vega, the county seat of Oldham County. The nearest large city is Amarillo, located approximately 20 miles east of Wildorado.

Wildorado's elevation is 3,921 feet (1,195 m).

History
Named for nearby Wildorado Creek, the community was founded in 1900 as a railway town along the Chicago, Rock Island and Gulf Railroad. It was first settled by Eugene Binford and John R. Goodman, who ranched in the area before 1900. A post office was established in 1904. In 1908, the railroad was completed and a town site was laid out. Goodman organized the Wildorado State Bank and built the Wildorado Hotel. A newspaper, the Wildorado Progress, began publication in 1909. By 1915, Wildorado had an estimated population of 100. During the 1920s and 1930s, the community endured droughts and dust storms. In 1936, Wildorado had a population of 57 with seven businesses. That figure increased to around 125 residents in the late 1940s. The gradual evolution of the Ozark Trail (Route 66) into Interstate 40 encouraged growth. After World War II, when travel became a popular past time, Wildorado responded with services along its portion of Route 66 and the population rose to over 200 by the late 1950s. The formation of the Wildorado Water Supply Corporation in 1976-77 ensured a rural water supply and irrigation wells. During the latter half of the twentieth century, the population hovered around 180. Although Wildorado is unincorporated, it has a post office, with the ZIP code of 79098.

Demographics

2020 census

As of the 2020 United States census, there were 201 people, 63 households, and 41 families residing in the CDP.

Education

Public education is provided by the Wildorado Independent School District. Troy Duck is the district's superintendent.  The district has a single campus that serves students in grades prekindergarten through 12th.  Wildorado ISD is rated an Exemplary District by the Texas Education Agency.  Wildorado Elementary accepts transfers and provides transportation by bus for accepted students.  Students in grades 9-12 attend one of the nearby neighboring districts. The new high school that is in operation will expand a grade each year until they run through the 12th grade. The first graduating class will be in 2021.

References

Unincorporated communities in Oldham County, Texas
Unincorporated communities in Texas
Populated places established in 1900
1900 establishments in Texas